Mark Hunter may refer to:

 Sir Mark Hunter (civil servant) (1865–1932), schoolmaster in India
 Mark Hunter (politician) (born 1957), British politician and LibDem MP for Cheadle
 Mark Hunter (ice hockey) (born 1962), retired NHL ice hockey player
 Mark Hunter (footballer) (born 1965), former Australian rules footballer with Footscray
 Mark C. Hunter (born 1974), Canadian naval historian
 Mark Hunter (musician) (born 1977), singer for the now defunct American heavy metal band Chimaira
 Mark Hunter (rower) (born 1978), Olympic gold medalist rower and Leander Club member
 Mark Hunter (keyboard player), keyboard player associated with Manchester band James
 Mark Hunter (podcaster), Scottish podcaster behind The Mellow Monday Show and the Tartan Podcast
 Mark Hunter (photographer), American photographer

See also
 Marc Hunter (1953–1998), rock and pop singer
 Marc Hunter (athlete) (born 1956), American athlete